Gunnar Olsson (born April 26, 1960) is a Swedish sprint canoer who competed from the mid-1980s to the early 1990s. Competing in two Summer Olympics, he won a silver medal in the K-2 1000 m event at Barcelona in 1992.

Olsson also won a silver medal in the K-2 10000 m event in Copenhagen at the 1993 ICF Canoe Sprint World Championships and two bronze medals in the K-4 10000 m event in Poznan 1993 ICF Canoe Sprint World Championships and in the K-2 1000 m event in Copenhagen 1993 ICF Canoe Sprint World Championships.

References

Sports-reference.com profile

1960 births
Canoeists at the 1988 Summer Olympics
Canoeists at the 1992 Summer Olympics
Living people
Olympic canoeists of Sweden
Olympic silver medalists for Sweden
Swedish male canoeists
Olympic medalists in canoeing
ICF Canoe Sprint World Championships medalists in kayak
Medalists at the 1992 Summer Olympics